Omorgus obesus is a species of hide beetle in the subfamily Omorginae and subgenus Afromorgus.

References

obesus
Beetles described in 1980